Ousmane Niang (born 10 April 1980) is a Senegalese sprinter who specialized in the 400 metres.

Niang finished eighth in 4 x 400 metres relay at the 1999 World Championships, together with teammates Assane Diallo, Ibou Faye and Ibrahima Wade.

External links

1980 births
Living people
Senegalese male sprinters
Athletes (track and field) at the 2000 Summer Olympics
Olympic athletes of Senegal
Universiade medalists in athletics (track and field)
Universiade medalists for Senegal